The Hong Kong Houseware Fair is a trade fair organised by the Hong Kong Trade Development Council, held annually (usually in mid-April) at the downtown location of the Hong Kong Convention and Exhibition Centre.   It is the largest fair of its kind in Asia and celebrates its 25th anniversary in 2010.

More than 2,200 exhibitors from 37 countries and regions will be showcasing their latest products in 2010. The fair's special highlights include Hall of Elegance, World of Pet Supplies, World of Fine Dining, Home Accents, Home Living, Outdoor Living and ASEAN Select.

In 2009, Bangladeshi exhibitors received $700,000 in orders through the fair. It incorporates elements of the discontinued HKTDC Summer Sourcing Show for Gifts, Houseware & Toys.

Major exhibit categories 
Artificial Flowers
Bar Accessories
Bathroom Accessories
Beauty & Fitness
Candles & Scent Sensation
Cleaning & Supplies
Furniture
Gardening & Outdoor Accessories
Handicrafts
Hardware & DIY Products
Health & Personal Care Items
Home Decorations
Kitchenware & Gadgets
Paintings & Objets d’Art
Pet Supplies
Silver Generation Products
Small Electrical Appliances
Tableware
Trade Services

Concurrent event 
The fair will be held concurrently with the HKTDC Hong Kong International Home Textiles Fair at the Hong Kong Convention and Exhibition Centre.

References

External links 
 

Trade fairs in Hong Kong